Bobby Byrne (1932 – March 9, 2017) was an American cinematographer.

Born in Jamaica, Queens, Byrne initially worked as an animation cameraman prior to moving into live action cinematography. He worked in the camera department for Conrad L. Hall and William A. Fraker. Fraker assigned Byrne to work as the camera operator on his directorial debut Monte Walsh. Other credits as camera operator include Paper Moon and New York, New York.

Byrne debuted as director of photography on the 1977 comedy Smokey and the Bandit for Hal Needham. He'd work with Needham again on Hooper, as well as for The End for Burt Reynolds.

Other credits include Sixteen Candles, Bull Durham, and 92 episodes of the NBC sitcom Mad About You. He retired from cinematography in 2006.

Byrne joined the American Society of Cinematographers in 1994. He died on March 9, 2017.

References

External links
Bobby Byrne at the Internet Movie Database

1932 births
2017 deaths
American cinematographers
People from Jamaica, Queens